Nicole Mosconi (2 June 1942 – 7 February 2021) was a French philosopher and professor.

Biography
Mosconi, née Aubineau, graduated from the École normale supérieure de jeunes filles in 1961 with an agrégation in philosophy. In 1992, she published "Savoir, rapport au savoir et différence des sexes". In 1994, she became a professor of educational sciences.

Mosconi participated in research activities with the Centre de recherches éducation et formation in Nanterre, as well as at the University of Paris 8 Vincennes-Saint-Denis. With her team in Saint-Denis, she contributed to epistemology research. With her Nanterre team, she published three books, titled Savoir et rapport au savoir, Pour une clinique du rapport au savoir, and Formes et formation du rapport au savoir. She was particularly interested in the study of sex and gender, and how social and educational factors result in differences of performance between genders in school and careers.

Mosconi sat on the management committee of the Institut Émilie-du-Châtelet upon its foundation in 2006, and remained a member after her retirement. She served on the editorial board of the journals  and Travail Genre et Sociétés.

Nicole Mosconi died on 7 February 2021 at the age of 78.

Publications

Books
 La mixité dans l'enseignement secondaire, un faux-semblant ? (1989)
 Égalité des sexes en éducation et formation (1998)
 Plaisir, souffrance, indifférence en éducation (2002)
 Traité des sciences et des pratiques de l'éducation (2006)
 De la croyance à la différence des sexes (2016)
 Genre et éducation des filles : Des clartés de tout (2017)

Collective Works
 Savoir et rapport au savoir (1989)
 Pour une clinique du rapport au savoir (1996)
 Formes et formation du rapport au savoir (2000)
 Autobiographie de Carl Rogers. Lectures plurielles (2003)

Distinctions
Knight of the Legion of Honour

References

1942 births
2021 deaths
Paris Nanterre University alumni
French philosophers
Academic staff of Paris Nanterre University
Place of birth missing
Academic staff of Paris 8 University Vincennes-Saint-Denis